Steneotarsonemus is a genus of plant-feeding mites.

Taxonomy
Selected species (35) include;
 Steneotarsonemus laticeps
 Steneotarsonemus pallidus
 Steneotarsonemus spinki

References

Trombidiformes